Gatareh (also Romanized as Gatāreh; also known as Shahrak-e S̱ārāllah) is a village in Dasht-e Abbas Rural District, Musian District, Dehloran County, Ilam Province, Iran. At the 2006 census, its population was 513, in 77 families.

References 

Populated places in Dehloran County